Hudson Institute of Medical Research is a leading Australian medical research institute recognised internationally for discovery science and translational research. 

It is an independent, not-for-profit medical research institute, based in the Melbourne suburb of Clayton in Victoria hosting approximately 450 researchers, postgraduate students and support staff. Hudson Institute strives to improve human health through groundbreaking, collaborative, medical research discoveries and the translation of these to real world impact. Its scientists research five areas of medical need: Inflammation, Reproductive Health and Pregnancy, Infant and Child Health, Cancer, and Hormones and Health.

The current director and CEO is distinguished researcher and international authority on microbiology and immunology, Professor Elizabeth Hartland.

The institute is partnered with Monash University and Monash Health, and is co-located with both organisations at the Monash Health Translation Precinct in Clayton.

Purpose 
The Institute's purpose is stated as ‘unravelling the mysteries of nature to cure disease’.

Organisation 
Hudson Institute of Medical Research is organised into five specialist research centres :
 Centre for Innate Immunity and Infectious Diseases
 Centre for Reproductive Health
 The Ritchie Centre
 Centre for Cancer Research
 Centre for Endocrinology and Metabolism
Within these centres, 45 research groups undertake basic, translational and clinical research into a range of diseases.

Research

Hudson Institute scientists examine 

 The body's innate immune responses and their role in cancer, autoimmune diseases and inflammation; infectious diseases including HIV, herpes and influenza.
 Fetal and neonatal health from conception to a baby's first breath of life to prevent and treat adverse events such as birth asphyxia, premature lung disease and ectopic pregnancy.
 The human placenta, embryo implantation and a woman's endometrium to improve reproduction and development and better treat and diagnose women's health conditions such as endometriosis.
 The molecular, genetic, endocrine and mitochondrial processes underlying cancer tumour development to identify and develop more effective cancer diagnostics and treatments.

Diseases Hudson Institute research 

 Antimicrobial resistance
 Assisted Reproductive Technologies (ART)
 Birth asphyxia
 Blood cancer
 Bowel cancer
 Bronchopulmonary dysplasia (BPD)
 Cerebral Palsy
 Childhood cancer
 Chronic obstructive pulmonary disease (COPD)
 COVID-19
 Endocrine hypertension
 Endometriosis
 Female infertility
 Fetal growth restriction (FGR)
 Gastroenteritis
 Inflammation and cancer
 Inflammatory bowel disease (IBD)
 Influenza
 Intersex conditions
 Lung cancer
 Lupus
 Male infertility
 Microbiome in health and disease
 Necrotising enterocolitis (NEC)
 Osteoperosis
 Ovarian cancer
 Pancreatic cancer
 Pelvic organ prolapse (POP)
 Pneumonia
 Preterm birth
 Stillbirth
 Stomach cancer
 Testicular cancer

History 
Hudson Institute of Medical Research was formed in January 2014 through a merger of the Monash Institute of Medical Research and Prince Henry's Institute of Medical Research.

Hudson Institute of Medical Research was named in honour of the late Professor Bryan Hudson, the founding Professor of Medicine at Monash University and first director of the Prince Henry's Hospital Medical Research Centre, which later became Prince Henry's Institute of Medical Research.

Professor Hudson was one of Australia's leading endocrinologists, and a renowned physician-scientist responsible for early work on the male reproductive hormone, Inhibin.

Education 
The Institute has a large student population, predominantly enrolled through Monash University, and hosts more than 170 postgraduate (Honours, Masters, BmedSci, and PhD) students each year.

Facilities 
A new federally-funded $87.5 million Monash Health Translation Precinct Translational Research Facility (TRF) was officially opened by then Australian Health Minister Sussan Ley MP in March 2016.

The facility contains research laboratory space, a platform technologies floor and a dedicated clinical trials centre, with eight beds and 21 chairs for the purpose of translating research into patient treatments.

The Institute's scientists and students have access to the MHTP Technology Platforms, which contain the following capabilities:
 Medical Genomics
 Mass Spectrometry
 Flow Cytometry
 Histology
 Micro Imaging
 Bioinformatics
 Cell Therapies
 Monash Biobank
 Immunoassay Facility

See also

Health in Australia

References

External links

Hudson Institute of Medical Research annual reports

Monash University
Medical research institutes in Melbourne
2014 establishments in Australia
Research institutes established in 2014